The Big Five law firms is a term informally used in South Africa to refer to those law firms which, collectively, are perceived to be the leading law firms based in South Africa.

The following firms are usually seen as comprising the "Big Five" (listed alphabetically):

Note1: Cliffe Dekker Hofmeyr was formerly allied with DLA Piper.  Its affiliation with DLA Piper ended at the end of August 2015.

Note2: On 1 February 2013, the firm entered into a collaborative alliance with global law firm Linklaters.

Note3: Deneys Reitz Inc, and then Norton Rose Fulbright, was formerly considered to form part of the big five law firms. Due to its decline, Werksmans, which was not part of the big five law firms, took its place.

Rankings

Chambers and Partners Global rankings

Chambers and Partners Global Rankings of the number of departments recognised as leaders in their respective fields in South Africa in 2020. This list is non-exhaustive.

Note1: Based on Band 1 rankings.

Who's Who Legal Global 100

Law firms included in the Global 100 aren't assigned a specific ranking.

Note3: firms listed alphabetically

Who's Who Legal South African Law firm of the year

Midsized law firms
Firms with more than 50 attorneys are generally viewed as midsize law firms.

Note1: On 1 June 2011, Deneys Reitz Inc joined UK based firm Norton Rose. Deneis Reitz, and then Norton Rose Fulbright, was formerly considered to form part of the big five law firms. Due to its decline, Werksmans, which was formerly outside of the big five law firms, took its place.

See also
Magic Circle (law)
Silver Circle (law)
Big Six law firms

References

 
South Africa
Law firms of Africa